Quarterflash (previously stylized as QuarterFlash) was an American rock group formed in 1980 in Portland, Oregon. The band was originally made up of the two current members, Orinda Sue "Rindy" Ross (lead vocals and saxophone) and her husband Marv Ross (guitars), along with Jack Charles (guitars), Rick DiGiallonardo (keyboards/synthesizers), Rich Gooch (electric bass), and Brian David Willis (drums and percussion). In a 1982 interview, Rindy Ross said that she viewed the saxophone as an extension of her voice, enabling her to express things she could not express with her voice alone.

Recording history
The group was formed by merging two popular Oregon bands, Seafood Mama (formerly Beggars Opera) and Pilot (not to be confused with the Scottish band of "Magic" fame). Continuing under the name Seafood Mama, the band originally released the picture-sleeved single "Harden My Heart" on a local private label, Whitefire Records, in the spring of 1980 (with the B-side track being "City of Roses"). "Harden My Heart" was a big hit on Portland radio stations and got the band a one-hour TV special, Seafood Mama In Concert, on KOIN on June 5, 1980. "Harden My Heart" would later be rerecorded by the band after they renamed themselves Quarterflash. The name came from an Australian slang description of new immigrants as "a quarter flash, three quarters foolish", which the Rosses found in a book at producer John Boylan's house.

Quarterflash signed to Geffen Records and released their self-titled debut album Quarterflash in September 1981. It reached No. 8 on Billboards Top LPs & Tapes chart, and sold over a million copies, earning RIAA platinum status on June 30, 1982. The album contained the new version of "Harden My Heart", which became their biggest single, reaching No. 3 on the Billboard Hot 100 (and the Top 20 in France). The follow-up single from the album, "Find Another Fool", reached No. 16. A second one-hour Portland television special, Quarterflash In Concert, was broadcast on KOIN on October 22, 1981, and simulcast on KGON. This concert was taped at the Paramount Theatre (the present-day Arlene Schnitzer Concert Hall) on October 15, 1981.

In between albums, the band appeared on soundtracks of two of 1982's biggest films, charting the theme to Ron Howard's Night Shift up to No. 60 on the Billboard Hot 100, and landing one of their B-sides, "Don't Be Lonely", in Fast Times at Ridgemont High.

Quarterflash released their second album, Take Another Picture, in 1983. It reached No. 34 in Billboard, and scored the single "Take Me to Heart", which reached No. 14. At some point after this album was released, both Charles and DiGiallonardo left the group. Opting to continue as a four-piece, the group completed a third album featuring contributions from unofficial group keyboardist/guitarist Daniel Brandt; released in 1985, Back Into Blue peaked at No. 150 on Billboard. The group later disbanded after getting dropped from Geffen Records.

In 1990, Quarterflash reunited, hiring session musicians, including bassist–vocalist Sandin Wilson, drummer Greg Williams, guitarist Doug Fraser, Mel Weith and Mel Kubik on saxophone and keyboards. The group released Girl in the Wind on Epic Records. In 1991, Rindy and Marv Ross founded the historic music ensemble The Trail Band''', which was formed at the request of the Oregon Trail Advisory Council to commemorate the 150th anniversary of the Oregon Trail.

In June 2008, Marv and Rindy Ross released a new Quarterflash album, Goodbye Uncle Buzz, but it did not chart. In September 2013, the band released a new album, Love Is a Road, which also failed to chart.  The Rosses announced their March 23, 2019 concert at the Alberta Rose Theater in Portland was their last show as Quarterflash.  They will continue to perform as a duet.

Discography

Studio albums

Compilation albumsThe Best of Quarterflash: The Millennium Collection (1996)Harden My Heart: The Best of Quarterflash'' (1997)

Singles

References

External links
Quarterflash (official website)

Ross Productions, Marv Ross' official website
Bangor Daily News (Maine), Dave Cheever, special to the News, Band is all flash, no part foolish, Sat.-Sun., February 20–21, 1982, page ME 9, includes black-and-white photo of band
Flashbacks to Happiness, Eighties Music Revisited, Randolph Michaels, Lincoln, Nebraska: iUniverse Books, 2005 (by Michael R. Smith), "From the Desk of Marv Ross, Guitarist for Quarterflash," pages 152-155. On page 153, Marv states that "Take Another Picture" is probably his favorite Quarterflash song which was released as a single.

1980 establishments in Oregon
1985 disestablishments in Oregon
American pop rock music groups
Epic Records artists
Female-fronted musical groups
Geffen Records artists
Musical groups established in 1980
Musical groups disestablished in 1985
Musical groups reestablished in 1990
Musical groups disestablished in 2019
Rock music groups from Oregon